Evey may refer to:

Evey Hammond, a character in the comic book series V for Vendetta

People with the surname
Dick Evey (1941–2013), American football player